Jaimal Singh (1839–1903) was an Indian spiritual leader. He became an initiate of Shiv Dayal Singh (Radha Soami). After his initiation, Jaimal Singh served in the British Indian Army as a sepoy (private) from the age of seventeen and attained the rank of havildar (sergeant). After retirement, he settled in a desolate and isolated spot outside the town of Beas (in undivided Punjab, now East Punjab) and began to spread the teaching of his guru Shiv Dayal Singh. The place grew into a colony which came to be called the "Dera Baba Jaimal Singh" ("the camp of Baba Jaimal Singh"), and which is now the world centre of the Radha Soami Satsang Beas organisation.

Singh was the first spiritual master and head of Radha Soami Satsang Beas until his death in 1903. Before his death he appointed Sawan Singh as his spiritual successor.

Youth and education 
Singh was born in July 1839 in the village of Ghuman, near Batala in Gurdaspur district, Punjab, Sikh Empire. His parents were Jodh Singh, a farmer, and Daya Kaur. His mother Daya Kaur was a devotee of the North Indian Sant Namdev, and at the age of four Singh started visiting the Ghuman shrine of Namdev.

At the age of five, Singh started his education with Khem Dass, a Vedantic sage. Within two years, Singh had become a good reader of the Guru Granth Sahib and also read the Dasam Granth.

At the age of 12, he came to understand that the Guru Granth Sāhib rejected pranayama (energy culture), hatha yoga (psycho-physiological development), tirtha yatra (pilgrimage), fasting, and rituals as means to finding the One God described by Guru Nanak. Singh came to the conclusion that he needed to find a master who taught the practice of the Anhad Shabad (Inner Sound).

He especially wanted a master who could explain the Guru Granth Sahib's reference to the Panch Shabd (Five Sounds). One such phrase is from Guru Nanak:
ghar meh ghar daykhā-ay day-ay so satgur purakh sujān.
 pañch sabad dhunikār dhun tah bājai sabad nīsān.

The True Guru, the All-knowing, Primal Being shows us our true home within the home of the self. 
 The Five Primal Sounds resonate and resound within; the Primal Sound is revealed there, vibrating gloriously.

Search and discipleship 
Between the ages of 15 to 17, Singh undertook an arduous journey through North India on a lengthy quest for a teacher, having decided at age 14 that he needed to find a Master of the Panch Shabd (Five Sounds). In 1856, his travels culminated in Agra city at the feet of his master Shiv Dayal Singh who initiated him into the practice of the Five Sounds, named Surat Shabd Yoga.

After his initiation, Singh was set on becoming a renunciate sadhu and devoting his attention full-time to abhyas (spiritual practice). His guru, however, told him that the followers of the Sant tradition did not beg like most sadhus, but earned their own living.  Singh had no inclination to work in his family's tradition of farming since it would then entail taking a wife. Hence, Shiv Dayal Singh advised the teen-aged Jaimal Singh to join the Army.

Ministry 
Singh retired from the Army on 7 June 1889 and returned to his home village Ghuman. Later, he built a hut at the village of Bal Saran on the banks of the Beas River in the Punjab, where he settled. This place is now a huge township known as the Dera Baba Jaimal Singh.

On a visit to Mari Pahar, now in Pakistan, Jaimal Singh initiated Sawan Singh, a military engineer, who eventually became his successor. He died on 29 December 1903.

Teachings 
Singh's teachings were those of his master who taught the need for a living spiritual guide, adept in the practise of the Nam or Inner Sound. Having practiced many different sadhanas during his youth, Singh was able to describe the merits and shortcomings of the various yogic methods in relation to Surat Shabd Yoga, the practice which he learned from his master.

Some excerpts from his teachings:
Suffering and troubles are blessings in disguise, for they are ordained by the Lord.  If our benefit lies in pain, He sends pain; if in pleasure, He sends pleasure.  Pleasures and pains are tests of our strength, and if one does not waver or deflect, then the Almighty blesses such souls with Naam (or Shabd).

What the Lord considers best, He is doing.  Do not bring yourself into the picture.  Live by the words of the Master, and continue performing your earthly duties.  When the fruit is ripe, it will fall of its own accord without injury to itself or the bearing branch. But if we pluck the unripe fruit forcibly from off the tree, the branch is injured and the raw fruit shrivels and is of little use.  Meeting a competent Master is the fulfillment of human birth: this is the fruit of life.  To live by His commandments insures its proper nurture. Daily Simran and Bhajan, to the maximum possible, are the best food and nourishment, and mergence with Shabd is its ripening and falling off.

All that the Gurmukh has, all that he does, all is Bhajan.
 
One should abide in the will of SatGuru at all times.

The body is just a dream. When the body is false then everything in the world is false. Naam Dhun is true, so cath him.

Notes

References

 Baba Jaimal Singh, Spiritual Letters, translated from Hindi, Beas: Radha Soami Satsang Beas.
 Baba Jaimal Singh, Spiritual Letters, new edition, translated from Hindi, Beas: Radha Soami Satsang Beas, 1998. 
 Baba Jaimal Singh, Words Divine, Nevada City, California: Radha Soami Society Beas-America, 1981; Beas: Radha Soami Satsang Beas, 1988.
 Kapur, Daryai Lāl, Heaven on Earth, translated, Beas: Radha Soami Satsang Beas, 1986.
 Kirpal Singh, A Great Saint: Baba Jaimal Singh: His Life and Teachings, Delhi: Ruhani Satsang; Ruhani Satsang USA, 1971 Franklin, New Hampshire: Sant Bani, 1971; Unity of Man, 2007; The Almighty Param Sant Kirpal Singh.

External links

 Radha Soami Satsang Beas
 Science Of The Soul Research Centre

Surat Shabd Yoga
Sant Mat gurus
1839 births
1903 deaths
People from Gurdaspur